Wyoming Highway 376 (WYO 376) is a  state highway in southern Sweetwater County, Wyoming, United States, that forms a loop off of the south side of the city of Rock Springs.

Route description
WYO 376 travels counterclockwise from west to east around the southern edge of Rock Springs. It travels from I-80 BL/US 20 Bus. (I-80 BL/US 20 Bus./Dewar Drive) southeast around the southern end of Rock Springs (briefly leaving the city limits), and turns back north as it nears Wyoming Highway 430 (WYO  430). (9th Street).

History
WYO 376 formerly continued in a counterclockwise direction from its current eastern terminus to connect back to the former U.S. Route 187 (Elk Street). Since U.S. Route 191 (US 191) was routed onto Interstate 80/U.S. Route 30 (I-80/US 30) north of Rock Springs, that portion of Elk Street was unnumbered. However, Wyoming Department of Transportation (WYDOT) maintains the section of Elk Street between I-80 BL/US 20 Bus. and I-80/US 30. It is mile-marked in the highway log as US 191, although signage shows US 191 bypassing the town via I-80/US 30. The northeast corner of the circumferential highway is not currently maintained by WYDOT.

Major intersections

See also

 List of state highways in Wyoming

References

External links 

 Wyoming State Routes 300-399
 City of Rock Springs website

Transportation in Sweetwater County, Wyoming
376